South Pasadena High School (SPHS or "South Pas") is the one public high school serving grades 9–12 in the city of South Pasadena, California. With the South Pasadena Middle School and three elementary schools (Arroyo Vista, Marengo, and Monterey Hills) it makes up the South Pasadena Unified School District.

Established in 1905, it is the only public high school in South Pasadena. The campus is on the west side of the city on Fremont Avenue. The school contains several main academic buildings, a performing arts auditorium, a swimming pool, two  sets of tennis courts, two indoor gymnasiums, a 400-m outdoor track, and three athletic fields. The school's motto is "Scholarship, Leadership, Strength, and Fair Play." The school colors are orange and black, and the mascot is a tiger.

History 

SPHS opened in 1906 after South Pasadena city officials approved a measure to construct a public high school in 1904. Until 1955, South Pasadena High School was known as South Pasadena-San Marino High School and served both cities. In 1954, the city of San Marino chose to withdraw from SPHS and to established San Marino Unified School District, along with San Marino High School

Athletics 
The school offers a variety of sports such as baseball, volleyball, football, water polo, basketball, cross country, soccer, track and field, tennis and others. A new athletic director, Anthony Chan, was hired in 2019.

The football field at South Pasadena High School is known today as Ray Solari Stadium in honor of the former football head coach, where South Pasadena High's football team plays their home games. It is also used for boys and girls' soccer teams and for track and field meets as well as for graduation ceremonies.

Partnership 
The school was one of the first to work with the Children's Hospital Los Angeles and the mobile Sports Analysis Lab, to help demonstrate how data is collected, evaluated and assessed to study athletes biomechanics.

Recognition and awards 
In 2019 the school was recognized due to its U.S. News & World Report ranking. It was ranked #1 in California's 41st State Assembly District, #87 in the state and #622 out of 17,000 public high schools within the United States, placing in the top 5% of schools nationwide. It was also ranked #675 out of 5,000 by Newsweek for the top STEM high schools of 2019.

Notable alumni
Steven Alvarez – actor/business entrepreneur
William Bradford Bishop – Former United States Foreign Service officer, accused murderer and wanted fugitive
Alison Brie – actress
John Bush – Professional Musician, Singer for the band Armored Saint
Wesley Chesbro - California Assemblyman and Senator
John Gabbert – Associate Justice of the California Court of Appeals
Bobby Garrett – former NFL player
John Hart – actor
George Hodel – physician accused of 1947 murder of Elizabeth Short, a.k.a. the Black Dahlia, and of committing several additional murders
William Holden - (William Beedle) – actor
Tommy Hutton - former Major League Baseball player
Porochista Khakpour - novelist, writer and reviewer for national and international publications
Bob Long – former NFL player
Mary Bono Mack – politician
Adrian Picardi – director
Bronson Pinchot – actor
Ward Ritchie – master printer, book designer
Noelle Scaggs – singer (Fitz and the Tantrums)
Shanice – singer
Leslie Smith - fighter
Hilary Swank – actress
Jaleel White – actor
Kristinia DeBarge – singer
Chris Spencer – actor/director/comedian

References

External links 
South Pasadena High School

South Pasadena, California
Art Deco architecture in California
High schools in Los Angeles County, California
Public high schools in California
1906 establishments in California